Silje Hjemdal (born 8 August 1984) is a Norwegian politician. 
She was elected representative to the Storting for the period 2017–2021 for the Progress Party.

References

1984 births
Living people
Progress Party (Norway) politicians
Women members of the Storting
Hordaland politicians
21st-century Norwegian politicians